Cleo Hill (April 24, 1938 – August 10, 2015) was an American professional basketball player who was selected by the St. Louis Hawks in the first round (8th overall) of the 1961 NBA draft. A  guard from Newark, New Jersey and the Winston-Salem State University, Hill played in the National Basketball Association for one season with the Hawks, in 1961–62, averaging 5.5 points in 58 games. Hill was only the fifth African-American from an historically Black college and university to be taken in the first round of an NBA draft.

In 2008, Hill was profiled in a segment on the ESPN documentary Black Magic, which told the story of African Americans and basketball. The segment asserted that early in that 1961–62 season, St. Louis Hawks coach Paul Seymour was told by team management to severely diminish Hill's offensive role so that stars Bob Pettit, Cliff Hagan, and Clyde Lovellette (who were all white) would receive more shot attempts. Seymour refused and was fired, and Hill's scoring averaged dropped from 10.8 points per game to 5.5 points per game. Hill never played in the NBA after that season.

Hill had denied that his race was a factor in his NBA struggles, saying, "It wasn't racial. It was points." He went on to become a successful head coach at Essex County College in Newark, New Jersey. A resident of Orange, New Jersey, Hill died at his home there on August 10, 2015.

Legacy
The March 18, 2022 game at Wofford at The Basketball Classic been designated the Cleo Hill Game. Due to scheduling issues the game was not played.

Hill Sr. is the father of current Winston-Salem State University Men's Basketball Head Coach Cleo Hill Jr.

References

External links
NBA stats @ basketballreference.com

1938 births
2015 deaths
African-American basketball players
American men's basketball players
Basketball players from Newark, New Jersey
Malcolm X Shabazz High School alumni
New Haven Elms players
Point guards
People from Orange, New Jersey
St. Louis Hawks draft picks
St. Louis Hawks players
Trenton Colonials players
Winston-Salem State Rams men's basketball players
20th-century African-American sportspeople
21st-century African-American people